Paul C. Whalen is a Republican former member of the Hawaii Senate, representing the 3rd District (North and South Kohala, North and South Kona) until 2008. He was a member of the 1998 class of the Pacific Century Fellows.

References 

1962 births
Living people
Republican Party Hawaii state senators